The Seven Nations are seven nations that according to the Hebrew Bible lived in the Land of Canaan prior to the arrival of the Israelites.

God instructed the Israelites to destroy these seven nations upon entering Canaan. The meaning and implications of these verses in historical contexts was discussed in later commentary.

The seven nations are all descendants of Canaan, son of Ham and grandson of Noah, from whom they derive their collective name Canaanites. When enumerated separately, one of the seven nations is called Canaanites, while the others are called the Amorites, the Girgashites, the Hittites, the Hivites, the Jebusites and the Perizzites.

References 

Canaanite people
Hebrew Bible nations